Natu may refer to:

People

Given name 
 Natu Gopal Narhar (1911–1991),  Marathi poet
 Natu Tuatagaloa (born 1966), former professional football player in the American NFL
 Natu (singer), pseudonym of Polish singer Natalia Przybysz

Surname 
 Natu (surname)
 Balaji Pant Natu, person in Indian history

Places
 Natu, Iran, a village in Razavi Khorasan Province, Iran
 Natu La, a mountain pass in the Himalayas

Other uses
 Natú language, an extinct language of eastern Brazil
 Natu (Pokémon), one of the fictional Pokémon species
 Soranik Natu, a fictional character in DC comics

See also